The Bréguet Br.1001 Taon was a 1950s French prototype single-seat jet strike fighter aircraft built by Bréguet.

Design and development
In 1953 European aircraft manufacturers were invited by NATO to submit aircraft for evaluation for the "LWSF" (Light Weight Strike Fighter) role. The Taon (en: Gadfly, but also an anagram of NATO or the French version OTAN) was designed to meet the requirement. The Taon was a small mid-wing monoplane with swept wings and tail surfaces and retractable tricycle undercarriage. The aircraft was powered by a Bristol Orpheus BOr.3 turbojet. The company was contracted to build three prototypes, the first aircraft flying on the 26 July 1957. The second aircraft incorporated improvements and had a slightly longer fuselage. Development was discontinued and only two aircraft were built.

Operational service
The Taon was evaluated without success, along with other designs which included the Fiat G.91, Northrop N-156, Dassault Étendard VI, Sud-Est Baroudeur and Aerfer Ariete. The NATO nations did not order a common aircraft and the French government preferred to pursue development of the Étendard.

The aircraft set an international speed record for a 1,000 km (620 mi) closed circuit with a speed of 1,046.65 km/h (650.36 mph) at 7,620 m (25,000 ft) on 25 April 1958. On 23 July, it broke the record again at a speed of 1,075 km/h (667.98 mph).

Variants
Br.1001
Prototype powered by a Bristol Orpheus BOr.3 engine, two built.

Br.1002
Proposed missile-carrying interceptor, not built.

Br.1004
Proposed production version powered by a Bristol Orpheus BOr.12 engine, not built.

Specifications (Br.1001 Taon)

See also

References

Bibliography

 

 1001
Single-engined jet aircraft
1950s French fighter aircraft
Low-wing aircraft
Aircraft first flown in 1957